Western Caspian University is a private university in Baku, Azerbaijan. Founded in 1991 by Husein Baghirov, it has six schools, 25 majors, 180 faculty and approximately 1500 students. The university took its name because it is modeled after Western universities in style of instruction and values, the latter in response to some of the corrupt practices under the Soviet system. Much of the instruction is conducted in English.

In the late 1990s, the school partnered with American universities, such as Indiana University, to help set up its programs in business and law. Many of its partnerships were formed through the now defunct United States Information Agency. Currently, the school has ties with Indiana University, University of Kansas, Mississippi Valley State University, University of North Alabama and Delta State University.

History

Foundation 
Founded in 1991, Western Caspian University is one of the first private higher education institutions established in Azerbaijan.  
The university became a member of several significant institutions, including the United Nations Educational, Scientific and Cultural Organization – UNESCO (1992); the European Development Fund (EDF) (the European Centre for Development Policy Management – ECDPM) (1996); The Black Sea Universities Network (BSUN, 1999); The International Institute of Administrative Sciences (IIAS, 2000), and The European Association for Tourism and Leisure Education (ATLAS). Western Caspian University maintains close co-operation with many authoritative international educational institutions.

Founding of this institution was influenced by the socio-political and economic processes passing in Eastern Europe and the CIS area after the collapse of the USSR in 1991.

Organization and administration

Schools, faculties and departments 
Western Caspian University offers broad programs at bachelor, master and PhD levels.

The School of High Technologies and Innovative Engineering

The School of High Technologies and Innovative Engineering was founded in 1991, entitled "The School of Mathematics and Computer Technologies.”

During its activity, the school trained specialists in Information Science and Computer Engineering, IT and Systems Engineering, as well as Computer Engineering and Information Technology specialists. In 2017, the department was renamed as The School of High Technologies and Innovative Engineering. Presently, the following specialisations are available at the school:

Bachelor (Undergraduate) Programs
Computer Engineering; 
Information Technologies; 
Mechanical Engineering; 
Ecological Engineering; 
Construction of Engineering Systems and Facilities  Engineering; 
Instrumentation Engineering;
Electronics, Telecommunications and Radio Engineering;
Mechatronics & Robotics Engineering; 
Recycling and Restoration Technologies Engineering; 
Polygraph Engineering; 
System Engineering; 
Engineering of Forest Products and Wood Processing Technologies;
Consumer Goods Expertise and Marketing; 
Forestry; 
Land, Soil and Urban Cadastre; 
Biology.

Master (Postgraduate) Programs
Management Information Systems; 
Agriculture and Environmental Protection.

PhD Programs
System Analysis, Management and Information processing.

The School of Architecture and Design
The School of Architecture and Design was established in 2017 at Western University.  This school was founded under the auspices of the Design Department that had functioned since 1996.

The following specialisations are available at the school for Bachelor, Master, PhD and doctoral studies:

Bachelor Programs 
Design
Architecture

Master Programs
Design and Technical Aesthetics

PhD and Doctoral Studies
Technical Aesthetics and Design

School of Economics
Activities in this field have been conducted since the first day of Western Caspian University. Various specialisations are available at the school – such as “Economy”, “Finance and Accounting”, “Management” and “Consumer Goods and Expertise in Marketing”. 
The school provides specialisation in the following subject areas:

Bachelor level
World Economy
Economy
Public and Municipal Administration
Industrial Engineering and Management
Consumer Goods, Expertise in Marketing

Master level 
International Economic Relations
Legal Regulation of the Economy
International Financial and Currency Credit Relations

PhD level
World Economy
Local Economy

Business School
The Business School provides training in the following specialisations:

Bachelor level
Finance
Management
Business Administration 
Tourism and Hotel Management
Accounting and Auditing

Master level 
Business Organization and Administration
Business Administration
Tax and Taxation 
Financial Control and Auditing
Innovation and Project Management 
Tourism and Socio-Cultural Services 
International Tourism and Regional Ethnography

PhD level
Domestic Fiscal Policy and State Finance

Department of Philology and Translation
This department has been entitled as the Department of Western Languages since 1996. Students are trained in philology (English language and philology) and translation (English, German, French). Since 2017, the department has continued its activity as the School of Philology and Translation.

The main direction of the department is training philologists, including translators of business, management, political studies, sociology and law.

In general, nine languages are taught at the school: Azerbaijani, English, German, French, Russian, Latin, Chinese, Spanish and Finnish. Foreign specialists – native speakers – are available to improve students’ language skills.

Currently, tuition is provided in the following disciplines at the faculty:

Bachelor Programs
Philology (English language and literature);
Translation (English, German, French);
Philology (Azerbaijani language and literature)
Teaching of English Language and Literature 
Master Programs
Translation 
Language Studies 
Literary Studies
 
PhD and Doctoral Studies
Germanic Languages
World Literature

School of Political and Public Sciences
The Department of Political Sciences had been the training, science and administrative division at Western University since day one. It led training at bachelor's and master's degree levels in the fields of Political Studies, Psychology, Regional Studies, International Journalism, International Relations and so on.

International programs 
Along with local specialists, the university regularly invites specialists from the United States, the United Kingdom, Canada, Netherland and other countries, to deliver training and lectures.

Short and long term education projects internationally create opportunities for participation in education programs abroad. Presently, within the Erasmus+ and Movlana Exchange projects, students of the university study at the leading universities of the Czech Republic,  Poland, Latvia, Romania, Turkey and Ireland. Western University realizes double diploma projects jointly with Coventry University, Great Britain and London School of Business & Finance in Singapore   and the University of business and International Studies (UBIS) in Switzerland.

Today, Western University's international network embraces more than 200 world authoritative education institutions.   International cooperative and bilateral activities include bachelor and master courses, articulation and development agreements, the Erasmus+ and Movlana Exchange projects and others.

Academic profile

Scientific research institutes 
The university regularly encourages scientific research. Two research institutes under the university – Continuous Human Development Institute, and Landscape Research Institute carry out scientific researches.

Laboratories and centres 
Western Caspian University is provided with modern, progressive laboratories and research centres.

Physics and Electronics Laboratory – creates an opportunity for students to carry out fundamental scientific calculations, extend and enhance their knowledge and application of the fundamentals of electronics and the laws of physics. 
The main aim of laboratory research is to facilitate understanding of the importance of knowledge in physics through real experiments carried out by appropriate instruments and equipment, as well as to make students aware of the necessary methods and means to carry out research in physics.

The Geomathic Centre is a unique centre at the university. Establishment of the centre aims to provide students with necessary software and technical skills for gathering information on Geoscience. Such laboratories were initially created at the end of the XX century, as there was a great demand for geoinformation.  Meeting increasing demands for geographic information was possible only through  integration of new technological opportunities for conducting traditional field-research activities. Geomathic centres ensure such kind of integration; they play a key role in conducting scientific-research activities in geographic information systems, distance space-air research, geodesy and mapping, photogrammetry, environment protection.

The university's Centre of Information Technologies is provided with equipment and computers. There is a 3D printer at the centre. Students are able to print items prepared in various formats.

The Science and Innovation Centre successfully implemented several projects in application of scientific and educational innovations.

The mission of the Confucius Centre at Western Caspian University is the promotion of Chinese language and Culture, as well as the development of cultural relations between China and Azerbaijan.

The Language Centre created at Western Caspian University aims to introduce fundamental changes in the teaching and learning process of foreign languages. Conceptually, it has the following format:   
to research difficulties and problems in teaching foreign languages; 
to realize programs in relations to learning foreign languages abroad at the university;  
to establish business relations with leading world language centres, in order to acquire language teaching practice.

Library 
The library at Western Caspian University is the richest library in the country. It has more than 60 000 books, more than 500 microforms and other sources of information. More than 16 000 books is available in English.

This library is the first and only library in the Republic to work in correlation with the UN Library.

The UN Library, established in 2016, continues the process of enriching the library fund with various publications of international institutions. The Depositary Library of the UN World Tourism Organization (UNWTO) was established at the university. And Western Caspian University was the first Azerbaijani University whose name was included in the library program.

The UN Convention to Combat Desertification, the UN Economic and Social Commission for Asia and the Pacific (ESCAP), the UN Population Fund (UNFPA), Secretary of the Intergovernmental Panel on Climate Change – joint international body of the World Meteorological Organization (WMO) and UN Environment Programme (UNEP) adopted a decision to present their publications to the Western Caspian University Library. The publications of these international organizations are regularly received by the library.

At the same time, Western Caspian University joined the Depository Library of The World Intellectual Property Organization (WIPO). Within this program, the WIPO sends publications to University twice a year.

Museum of Thor Heyerdahl 
The centre has been officially opened during the Thor Heyerdahl Film Festival week, on May 12–20, 2014. It is dedicated to the commemoration of his 100 anniversary.

Museum which is permanently located on the second floor of the main building of Western Caspian Iniversity, contains archive materials related to his activity. It includes documentary films, articles, books about his expeditions, memoirs, handwritten postcards and images from his great journeys, including photos from his visit to Azerbaijan.

The following books about Thor Heyerdal have been translated into the Azerbaijani language by Western Caspian University:
1) The Kon-Tiki Expedition  
2) The Ra Expeditions
3) Exploration series I-IX

Student life

Student Youth Organization 
Student Youth Organization (SYO) confirmed its efficiency as a democratic student self-governing body system and creator of close relationships between the university administration and students. The SYO acts within the following responsibilities:    
Conducting surveys among students, exploring their view-points and wishes;
preparing and introducing comments and proposals on specific problems of students’ life;
protecting the students’ rights and interests (including social interests);
introducing proposals on elimination of negative effects on the quality of the teaching process and causes of legal violation.

Career 
The Career and Graduate Coordination Centre offers services on providing practice and career opportunities, ensuring smooth the student-University relationship, hiring a big number of specialists to conduct practical and individual sessions for students and organizing trainings on priority topics.

Western Caspian University welcomes close cooperation with numerous organizations for further internship and employment of students. The key mission of the Students Service Centre is to implement projects with a view to provide intellectual and cultural development, student's capacity building, maintain continuous communication with University alumni.
   
The centre assists graduates to find job in their specific fields. Information for all students at the university is kept in a database which is updated annually. The centre often initiates meetings with representatives of foreign companies and organizations operating in Azerbaijan. Since its launch, the centre has assisted hundreds of graduates and students to find respective jobs.
Western Caspian University cooperates with major government institutions (Parliament, Ministries and Committees, institutes under Azerbaijan National Academy of Sciences) and banking sector for successful internship activities. Big number of students was later hired by this organizations.

Notable alumni 

Many young Azerbaijanis that have achieved success in their careers are alumni of Western Caspian University:
Nargiz Gurbanova, PhD, Ambassador Extraordinary and Plenipotentiary of the Republic of Azerbaijan to the Republic of Bulgaria

Western Caspian University’s High School 
Western Caspian University High School established in 2003 applies the up-to-date methods and curriculum standards.

In addition to the complete secondary education tailored to the high international standards, special emphasis is given to foreign languages – English, French and German. Tuition process applies a variety of interactive and technologically advanced learning tools. Conversation classes with foreign experts create favorable conditions for advanced language learning.

The school is equipped with ICTs, modern laboratories, MimioStudio software and smart boards. The library contains a wide range of science fiction and other related literature.

The high school students and their team leaders are able to participate in summer exchange programs at the Katherine and Kings College of London and English Language School in Beckenham, England.

Thanks to the high-quality training, high school seniors have succeeded in entry examinations (100 percent) over the last 10 years. Some of them were awarded with presidential scholarship for excellent results achieved at the admission exams.

Graduates from the Western University High School achieve the highest scores every year and enter the most prestigious universities not only in Azerbaijan, but also in many countries around the world, such as the University of Texas and James Madison University (US), Czech Technical University in Prague, Istanbul Bilgi University (Turkey), St. Petersburg State University of Industrial Technologies and Design (Russia), Cyprus International University in Northern Cyprus and International University “MITSO”, etc.

The Training Centre at Western Caspian University 
The Western Knowledge Training Centre at Western Caspian University runs academic preparatory classes that are conducted by highly qualified specialists and include:
Preparing students to begin University tuition  
Training masters 
Preparing to pursue a civil service career
Foreign language courses 
Preparing to study abroad 
Languages courses abroad

Notes 

 
Educational institutions established in 1991
1991 establishments in Azerbaijan